The following is a list of flags of Denmark.

National flag and State flag

Royal flags

Historical Royal flags

Military flags

Army

Former regiments of the Royal Danish Army

Navy

Customs services

Flags of state-owned companies

Subnational flags

Autonomous entities

Regions

Unofficial regional flags
Some areas in Denmark have unofficial flags, listed below. The regional flags of Bornholm and Ærø are known to be in active use. The flags of Vendsyssel (Vendelbrog), the Jutlandic flag ("Den jyske fane"), and the flag of Funen ("Fynbo fanen") are obscure. None of these flags have legal recognition in Denmark, and are officially considered to be "fantasy flags". Denmark reserves official recognition to official flags and regional flags (områdeflag) from other jurisdictions.

Political flags

Ethnic groups flags

Historical

House flags of Danish freight companies

Yacht clubs of Denmark

Other flags/Microstate flags

References

See also

 Flag of Denmark
 Coat of arms of Denmark

 
Lists and galleries of flags
Nordic Cross flags
Flags